Miss USA 2010 was the 59th Miss USA pageant, held at the Theatre for the Performing Arts in Planet Hollywood Resort and Casino in Las Vegas, Nevada on May 16, 2010 which was broadcast live on NBC. Kristen Dalton of North Carolina, crowned her successor, Rima Fakih of Michigan as Miss USA 2010 at the end of this event. This was Michigan's third Miss USA title and the first title in 17 years. Fakih became the first Arab American to win the Miss USA title. This was also the first pageant since 1986 taking place in the month of May.

Fakih represented the United States at the Miss Universe 2010 pageant in Las Vegas on August 23, 2010 where she did not advance to the semifinals; becoming the fifth Miss USA to do so in Miss Universe history (the last time was Shauntay Hinton in 2002).

Fakih's victory was made controversial with charges of bias facing the Miss USA pageant after Morgan Elizabeth Woolard, who was runner-up, defended Arizona's anti-illegal immigration bill.

The pageant was co-hosted by Australian celebrity chef Curtis Stone and Today show correspondent Natalie Morales. Color commentary was provided by Joan and Melissa Rivers. Pop rock band Boys Like Girls performed during the swimsuit competition and country music star Trace Adkins performed during the evening gown competition. Stone, Adkins, and both Rivers have all appeared on Donald Trump's television show Celebrity Apprentice.

Background

Selection of contestants
One delegate from each state and the District of Columbia was chosen in state pageants held which began in July 2009 and ended in January 2010. The first state pageant was Florida, held on July 11, 2009. The final pageant was Arkansas, held on January 10, 2010.

Nine delegates are former Miss Teen USA state winners and two are former Miss America state winners. One delegate became a future Miss America state winner.

Preliminary round
Prior to the final telecast, the delegates competed in the preliminary competition, which involves private interviews with the judges and a presentation show where they compete in swimsuit and evening gown. The preliminary competition took place on May 12, 2010, at 10 pm (ET) hosted by Chet Buchanan and Kristen Dalton, and was broadcast online over Ustream. The 2010 pageant drew the notice of conservative commentators for releasing a set of "exotic and revealing" promotional photos.

Finals
During the final competition, the fifteen delegates with the highest average score from the preliminary competition were announced. The top fifteen competed in swimsuit, while the top ten competed evening gown, and the top five competed in the final question signed up by a panel of judges to determine the winner. The judges' composite score was shown after each round of competition for the fourth time since 2002.

Results

Placements

Special awards

Final scores

 Winner
 First Runner-up
 Second Runner-up
 Third Runner-up
 Fourth Runner-up
 Top 10 Finalist
 Top 15 Semifinalist
(#) Rank in each round of competition

Order of announcements

Top 15

Top 10

Top 5

Delegates

Judges

Preliminary judges
Billie Causieestko
Chip Lightman
Colleen Grillo
Guy McCarter
Leigh Rossini
Rich Thurber
Scott Lochmus

Final judges
Carmelo Anthony - NBA’s Denver Nuggets who is a two-time Olympic medalist.
Tara Conner - Miss USA 2006 from Kentucky
Paula Deen - Best-selling author, chef and host of four shows on The Food Network.
Oscar Nunez - Star of NBC’s hit comedy series, “The Office”.
Phil Ruffin - American businessman and real estate mogul.
Suze Yalof-Schwart - Executive Fashion Editor-at-Large of Glamour.
Melania Trump - Model who has appeared on multiple magazine covers including Vogue and the Sports Illustrated Swimsuit Issue.
Johnny Weir - Three-time National Champion figure skater and Olympian.

Background music

Preliminary
Special Performance: "Soundcheck" by Sean Van der Wilt

Telecast
Contestants Introduction: "Telephone" by Lady Gaga featuring Beyoncé and "Tik Tok" by Ke$ha (background music)
Swimsuit Competition: "Heart Heart Heartbreak" by Boys Like Girls (live performance)
Evening Gown Competition: "This Ain't No Love Song" by Trace Adkins (live performance)

Historical significance 
 Michigan wins competition for the third time.
 Oklahoma earns the 1st runner-up position for the second time. The last time it placed this was in 1989.
 Virginia earns the 2nd runner-up position for the first time and reaches its highest placement since Patricia Southall in 1994.
 Colorado earns the 3rd runner-up position for the second time. The last time it placed this was in 1963.
 Maine earns the 4th runner-up position for the first time and surpasses its previous highest placement in 1977. Coincidentally, Maine survived three elimination cuts for the first time.
 States that placed in semifinals the previous year were Arkansas, California, Tennessee and Virginia.
 California placed for the sixth consecutive year.
 Tennessee  placed for the fifth consecutive year.
 Arkansas and Virginia placed for the second consecutive year.
 Mississippi, Missouri, Oklahoma and Pennsylvania last placed in 2008.
 Kansas and Michigan last placed in 2007.
 Alabama and Maine last placed in 2006.
 Colorado last placed in 2000.
 Wyoming last placed in 1986.
 Nebraska last placed in 1980.
 Minnesota breaks an ongoing streak of placements since 2008.
 Utah breaks an ongoing streak of placements since 2007.
 South Carolina breaks an ongoing streak of placements since 2006.
 Texas breaks an ongoing streak of placements since 2001. Ironically, Kandace Krueger won the title in 2001 and the streak began here.

Contestant notes
Tracy Turnure, Miss Washington USA, was crowned by her twin sister Tara Turnure. This marks the first time that twins have won back-to-back at a Miss USA state pageant.
Belinda Wright, Miss Nebraska USA, returned home on May 8 after her father was killed in a farming accident.  She later returned to Las Vegas prior to the preliminary competition on May 11.
Rima Fakih is the first Arab American to win the contest. When she won, she had to face many racist comments and allegations. The same thing happened when Nina Davuluri won rival pageant Miss America a few years later.

Prize package
Miss Congeniality: The award is for a contestant that exemplifies respect and admiration of the contestant's peers, who voted for her as the most congenial. She was awarded a $1,000 cash prize as well as a Flip MinoHD Video Camcorder and jewelry from Diamond Nexus Labs.

Miss Photogenic: The general public voted on www.nbc.com  for the contestant who exemplifies beauty through the lens of a camera. She was awarded a $1,000 cash prize as well as a Flip MinoHD Video Camcorder and jewelry from Diamond Nexus Labs.

Miss USA 2010: A custom diamond tiara and jewelry by Diamond Nexus Labs; a shoe collection from Nina Footwear; a one-year scholarship from the New York Film Academy; hair care products and accessories from Farouk Systems; eveningwear wardrobe by Sherri Hill; a Flip MinoHD Video Camcorder; a collection of luggage by Heys USA Inc.; luxury accommodations in a New York City apartment for the duration of her reign, including living expenses; gym membership to Gravity Fitness; hair services from John Barrett Salon; modeling portfolio by photographer Fadil Berisha; dermatology services from Dr. Cheryl Thellman-Karcher; health and nutrition consultation by Tanya Zuckerbrot, MS, RD; dental services by Dr. Jan Linhart, D.D.S.; casting opportunities and professional representation by the Miss Universe Organization; a year-long salary as Miss USA; extensive travel opportunities representing sponsors and charitable partners; year-long consultation with a fashion stylist and access to a personal appearance wardrobe and the opportunity to represent the USA at Miss Universe 2010 this summer in Las Vegas.

Notes

References

External links
 Miss USA official website

2010
May 2010 events in the United States
2010 beauty pageants
2010 in Nevada
Zappos Theater